"Everybody Wake Up (Our Finest Hour Arrives)" is a song recorded and performed by the Dave Matthews Band from their sixth studio album studio album, Stand Up (2005). The song was released as the third radio single in support of the album.

Track listing
American radio promo
"Everybody Wake Up (Our Finest Hour Arrives)" (album version) – 4:17

Charts

Personnel
 Carter Beauford – drums, percussion
 Stefan Lessard – bass
 Dave Matthews – vocals, guitar
 LeRoi Moore – tenor and baritone saxophones
 Boyd Tinsley – electric violin, mandolin
 Butch Taylor – Rhodes, organ
 Mark Batson – Mellotron, vocals, percussion

References

2005 songs
Dave Matthews Band songs
Songs written by Dave Matthews
Songs written by Mark Batson
2006 singles
Songs written by Carter Beauford
Songs written by LeRoi Moore
Songs written by Stefan Lessard
Songs written by Boyd Tinsley
Song recordings produced by Mark Batson